Sam Holmes is a YouTuber and solo sailor best known for his YouTube channel Sam Holmes Sailing. Holmes has numerous sailing feats which have been documented on his YouTube channel including sailing from California to Hawaii in a Ranger 23 sailboat, crossing the Atlantic to Europe in his Cape Dory 28, and sailing to Svalbard.

References 

YouTube vloggers
American sailors
Single-handed sailors
Living people